The Zhushan Power Plant is a (diesel) fuel-fired power plant in Cingshuei Village, Nangan Township, Matsu Islands, Taiwan (ROC). It is the only power plant in the Matsu islands.

History
The installation of the generation units were done in 2007. The construction of the power plant was completed in 2009. It was commissioned on 22 March 2010. In October 2014, the plant was organized to be the subordinate of Hsieh-ho Power Plant in Keelung with the official name of Zhushan Branch Power Plant of the Keelung's plant.

Generation units
The power plant has four diesel fuel-fired units.

See also

 List of power stations in Taiwan
 Electricity sector in Taiwan

References

2010 establishments in Taiwan
Buildings and structures in Lienchiang County
Energy infrastructure completed in 2010
Nangang Township
Oil-fired power stations in Taiwan